Andrei Inešin (born 18 January 1967) is an Estonian sport shooter who competed in the 1992 Summer Olympics, in the 1996 Summer Olympics, in the 2000 Summer Olympics, in the 2004 Summer Olympics, and in the 2008 Summer Olympics. He won a gold medal at the 2006 ISSF World Shooting Championships.

Inešin was born in Tallinn. He began training in 1981 at the Rocca al Mare shooting range under the guidance of Vladimir Bobrov. Later, his coaches were Dimitri Mälson (1999–2001) and Mati Mark (2001–2008). He became a member of the Estonian National Team in 1993.

Olympic results

References

External links
 
 
 

1967 births
Living people
Estonian male sport shooters
Skeet shooters
Olympic shooters of the Unified Team
Olympic shooters of Estonia
Shooters at the 1992 Summer Olympics
Shooters at the 1996 Summer Olympics
Shooters at the 2000 Summer Olympics
Shooters at the 2004 Summer Olympics
Shooters at the 2008 Summer Olympics
Sportspeople from Tallinn
20th-century Estonian people